Mazin is a Slavic masculine surname, its feminine counterpart is Mazina. It may refer to
Alexander Mazin (born 1959), Russian writer, poet and songwriter
Craig Mazin (born 1971), American screenwriter and film director
Maria Mazina (born 1964), Russian Olympic champion épée fencer
Viktor Mazin (1954–2022), Kazakh weightlifter